Sultan Han is a historic Seljuk-era caravanserai in Turkey, located 47 km northeast of Kayseri on the road to Sivas, in an area also known as Tuzhisar. It was built between 1232 and 1237 CE by Sultan Ala ad-Din Kayqubad I.

Description 
The caravanserai covers an area of 3,900 square meters, making it the second-largest medieval caravanserai in Turkey after the other Sultan Han near Aksaray. Like other Seljuk caravanserais, it served as a stop for travelers and merchants along the major trade routes of the region, providing lodging and other basic services. 

It shares a similar layout to the other Sultan Han. Its exterior has a fortified appearance and the entrance is marked by a monumental portal with rich stone-carved decoration including a vaulted canopy of muqarnas. This entrance leads to a large interior courtyard surrounded by arcades, at the middle of which is a small square stone chamber elevated on four pillars, which served as a small mosque. Opposite the entrance, at the other end of the courtyard, is another portal which leads to the "winter hall": a main vaulted nave with a central dome (marked by a conical roof on the outside), from which other vaulted chambers open on either side. The building also contains notable examples of Seljuk stone-carved animal motifs, including drain spouts resembling lion heads and serpentine dragon motifs along the lower arches of the elevated mosque in the courtyard.

References

External links 

 Tuzhisar Kayseri Sultan Han (includes description, numerous pictures and a floor plan)

Buildings and structures completed in the 13th century
Buildings and structures of the Sultanate of Rum
Caravanserais in Turkey
Seljuk architecture
Buildings and structures in Kayseri Province